Sofiane Milous (born 1 July 1988, Drancy) is a French judoka who competes in the men's 60 kg category and winner of the 2010 European Championships in that division. He was French champion in 2011 and 2015.  At the 2012 Summer Olympics, he was defeated in the quarter finals.  He beat Betkili Shukvani and Tony Lomo before losing to Hiroaki Hiraoka.  Because Hiraoka reached the final, Milous entered the repechage, beating Hovhannes Davtyan before losing to Rishod Sobirov in his bronze medal match.

In 2015, he won the African Open.

References

External links

 
 

French male judoka
Living people
Olympic judoka of France
Judoka at the 2012 Summer Olympics
1988 births
People from Drancy
Sportspeople from Seine-Saint-Denis
21st-century French people